Hewa Salam Khalid is a young Kurdish scholar, PhD in Kurdish language and culture, and he is a lecturer at Koya University - Kurdistan Region of Iraq. He also left his previous PhD at EMU in Turkish Cyprus because he was forced to not mention the name of Kurdistan in his thesis. Currently, he is also a CEO of Kurdish Language Courses.

Publications
 Newroz from Kurdish and Persian Perspectives -A Comparative Study 
 Hinker; Central Kurdish Language Teaching 
 Adjectives in Kurdish language: Comparison between dialects 
 The Language and Politics of Iraqi Kurdistan: from the 1991 Uprising to the Consolidation of a Kurdish Regional Government Today
 National Fabric; Iran ethnic minorities 
 New Forms and Functions of Subordinate Clause in Kurdish 
 Kurdish Dialect Continuum, As a Standardization Solution 
 I am afraid of Land's escape - novel - 2008

References

Kurdish-language writers
Year of birth missing (living people)
Living people